"The USA by Day and the RAF by Night" is a World War II era song written and composed by Hal Block and Bob Musel. The song was published by Paramount Music Corp. in 1944. According to the book The Songs That Fought the War by John Bush Jones, the song "applauds the heavy air strikes on Germany by Britain's Royal Air Force and the Army Air Force of the United States, specifically the strikes on the Ruhr that began on March 5, 1943, and the saturation bombing of Hamburg that started on July 24."

References

1944 songs
Songs of World War II
Songs about the United States
Songs about the United Kingdom
Songs with lyrics by Robert Musel